William Wentworth (William Charles Wentworth I) (1790–1872), was an Australian explorer, barrister, newspaper publisher, politician and landowner.

William Wentworth may also refer to:

William Wentworth, 2nd Earl of Strafford (1626–1695), United Kingdom peer, 2nd Earl of Strafford
William Wentworth, 2nd Earl of Strafford (1722-1791), United Kingdom peer, 2nd Earl of Strafford of a later creation
Bill Wentworth (1907–2003), (William Charles Wentworth IV), Australian politician, first federal Minister for Aboriginal Affairs
William Wentworth (elder),(1616–1697) ancestor of most North American Wentworths
William P. Wentworth (1839–1896), American architect